Black Tickle (Inuttitut: Kikkertet) is a "remote Aboriginal settlement" and designated place in Newfoundland and Labrador on the Island of Ponds. In the 2021 census Black Tickle had a population of 87. Locations in Labrador south of Black Tickle generally observe Newfoundland Time instead of Atlantic Standard Time, which is observed by the rest of the province's continental communities. Black Tickle is inaccessible by road and is served by Black Tickle Airport, a gravel strip airport (CCE4).

The Goose Bay - Cartwright - Black Tickle ferry service, MV Kamutik W., runs from June to November.

History
In 2012, the local fish plant closed. In 2016, it was announced that Black Tickle would no longer be covered by a full-time nurse and could lose its fuel source during winter months.

Beginning in 2015, it has been in the news for its large presence of polar bears.

Geography 
Black Tickle-Domino is  located on the Northwestern head of the Island of Ponds off the coast of Southwestern Labrador within Subdivision B of Division No. 10.

Demographics 

Government 
Black Tickle-Domino is a local service district (LSD) that is governed by a committee responsible for the provision of certain services to the community. The chair of the LSD committee is Joseph Keefe.

References

Inuit in Newfoundland and Labrador
Populated places in Labrador
Road-inaccessible communities of Newfoundland and Labrador